Glewice  is a village in the administrative district of Gmina Goleniów, within Goleniów County, West Pomeranian Voivodeship, in north-western Poland. It is located in the historic region of Pomerania.

The village has a population of 130.

Transport
The Solidarity Szczecin–Goleniów Airport, the main international airport of north-western Poland, is located in Glewice, and the S6 highway runs through the village.

References

Glewice